Lise Myhre (born 1 November 1975 in Lørenskog) is a Norwegian cartoonist. Her most famous cartoon is Nemi.

Biography
After a short study of graphical design at the Santa Monica College of Art in California, Lise Myhre started her career as an artist, earning money illustrating CD covers and T-shirts. She also participated in cartoon competitions and started giving contributions to Larsons Galne Verden, the Norwegian version of Gary Larson's magazine The Far Side ("M.P." in 1996).

From 1997, Myhre was given her own page in Larsons Gale Verden, "Den svarte siden", and this developed into Nemi.
From 1999, Nemi was a guest cartoon in the Norwegian newspaper Dagbladet, and from 2000 as a regular. The first Nemi album was published the summer 2000, and it was a great success. Since Myhre changed publisher, from Bladkompaniet to Egmont, in January 2003, there is a new Nemi magazine published every 6 weeks.

Nemi, with a circulation of more than 70,000 copies, is now one of the two most popular cartoons in Norway, next to Pondus.

Nemi is today published in approximately 60 different newspapers, magazines and websites in Norway, Sweden, Denmark, Finland. Amongst these, Dagens Nyheter (Sweden), Ilta-Sanomat (Finland) and Dagbladet (Norway) are the biggest.

Lise Myhre has also illustrated poems by Edgar Allan Poe and André Bjerke.

She was married to musician ICS Vortex (Simen Hestnæs), and they have a son, Storm, born 2007.

External links 

 Article on Nemi 
 Nemi in the online newspaper Spray 
 An interview on bdtheque.com

1975 births
Living people
Norwegian cartoonists
Norwegian women cartoonists
Norwegian comics artists
Norwegian female comics artists
People from Lørenskog
Norwegian expatriates in the United States